Vlasovo is a rural locality (a village) in Nizhneshardengskoye Rural Settlement, Velikoustyugsky District, Vologda Oblast, Russia. The population was 2 as of 2002.

Geography 
The distance to Veliky Ustyug is 26 km, to Peganovo is 1 km. Gerasimovo is the nearest rural locality.

References 

Rural localities in Velikoustyugsky District